Without Love may refer to:

Music

Albums
 Without Love (Black 'n Blue album)
Without Love, an album by  Tinga Stewart

Songs
 "Without Love" (Alice Glass song)
 "Without Love" (Hairspray song)
 "Without Love" (Nick Lowe song), a 1979 song by Nick Lowe from the album Labour of Lust, covered in 1980 by Johnny Cash
 "Without Love" (Clyde McPhatter song) (1957), covered by Little Richard, Ray Charles, Tom Jones
 "Without Love", a 1986 song by Bon Jovi, found on Slippery When Wet
 "Without Love", a 1974 song by Aretha Franklin
 "Without Love", a 1973 song by Katja Ebstein
 "Without Love", a 1996 song by Donna Lewis from the album Now in a Minute
 "Without Love", a 1913 poem by Galaktion Tabidze
 "Without Love", a 2016 song by the Descendents from the album Hypercaffium Spazzinate
 "Without Love", a 2011 song by Sara Groves from the album Invisible Empires
 "Long Train Runnin'", a 1973 song by the Doobie Brothers that prominently features the words "without love" in the chorus

Other uses
 Without Love (film), a 1942 play by Philip Barry adapted to a 1945 film with Spencer Tracy and Katharine Hepburn